NEDD9-interacting protein with calponin homology and LIM domains is a protein that in humans is encoded by the MICAL1 gene.

Interactions
MICAL1 has been shown to interact with NEDD9 and RAB1A.

References

Further reading